Bozhidar Stoychev (born 1 May 1991) is a Bulgarian footballer who last played as a goalkeeper for Bansko.

Honours

Club
Rabotnički Skopje
First Macedonian League: 2013–14

References

External links

Living people
1991 births
Bulgarian footballers
First Professional Football League (Bulgaria) players
PFC CSKA Sofia players
Akademik Sofia players
Neftochimic Burgas players
PFC Lokomotiv Plovdiv players
FK Rabotnički players
FC Bansko players
Expatriate footballers in North Macedonia
Association football goalkeepers